Samir Bhatia is an Indian entrepreneur and is the Founder and CEO of SMEcorner. Samir is a Chartered Accountant and a Cost Accountant, and has worked with companies such as Citibank, HDFC Bank, Barclays Bank and Equifax.

Education

Samir is a Chartered Accountant from the Institute of Chartered Accountant of India and a Cost Accountant from the Institute of Cost and Management Accountants of India. Samir qualified as a Chartered Accountant in November 1986 and stood 7th All India in the CA Final Exams.

Career

Samir is a veteran of Wholesale and Retail banking with decades of experience in leadership roles across leading financial institutions. He started his career with Citibank and worked in risk credit and finance functions. He played a key role in HDFC Bank as a founding team member and headed the Corporate and SME Business. He built the Retail and Commercial business in India for Barclays. He established the JV for Equifax in India from inception, including identifying local partners and acquiring the licence from the Central Bank.

SMEcorner

SMEcorner is a new age financial lending firm that focuses on providing services to small and medium enterprises. Our superior technology enables us to make lending process faster and easier. We are currently present across 4 states in 13 cities with 24 branches in states like Maharashtra, Gujarat, Rajasthan, and Delhi. SMEcorner's mission is to fill India's SME lending gap. SME owners can fund their business through our 2 different products- unsecured business loans & Loan against property, in as fast as 1 days. Our lending process is based on a combination of traditional and new alternate data, with strong use of decision science.

Volunteer experience and causes

Samir has volunteered for charitable organizations like UNICEF in the past. He has been an Advisory Board Member at AmeriCares India. Animal welfare is very close to Samir's heart and Samir is actively associated with various annual welfare organizations in India.

Organizations Samir supports:
The Welfare of Stray Dogs
In Defense of Animals
World for All Animals
Save Our Strays

Marathon

Samir is an avid runner and takes a keen interest in fitness and, in particular, running. Samir has run 50+ marathons. Samir is one among just approximately 1000 people in the world to have completed world marathon majors (New York, Chicago, Berlin, Tokyo, London, and Boston). The race of champions, this is a series that consists of the largest and the most renowned marathons.

References

External links
http://samirbhatia.in/

1963 births
Living people
Businesspeople from Mumbai
Indian accountants
University of Mumbai alumni